Sergey Drozd (born 24 June 1983) is a Belarusian professional footballer who plays for Molodechno.

References

External links

Profile at teams.by

1983 births
Living people
Belarusian footballers
Association football defenders
FC Chist players
FC Molodechno players
FC Khimik Svetlogorsk players
FC Slutsk players
FC PMC Postavy players